Los Fabulosos Cadillacs is an Argentine ska band from Buenos Aires.

Background and style 
Formed in 1985, they released their first album, Bares y Fondas (Bars and Boardinghouses), in 1986 and have since released fourteen more albums. They are one of the most influential and most-referenced ska bands of the Latin ska world.

The band's sound is a mix of ska, salsa, mambo, reggae, funk and samba. It is also noted for its irreverent and humorous lyrics which often contain political undertones.  The line-up has changed throughout the years, but the core members have always been the co-founders: lead singer Gabriel Fernandez Capello (known as Vicentico) and bass player and backing vocalist Flavio Cianciarulo (known as Sr. Flavio). Vicentico and Sr. Flavio have done the majority of the songwriting and lyrics as well. Saxophonist Sergio Rotman, drummer Fernando Ricciardi and keyboardi player Mario Siperman have also been in all line-ups of the band. Trumpeter Daniel Lozano joined in 1986, replacing Serguei Itzcowick. Another saxophonist, Naco Goldfinger was in the band from 1985 to 1991. Guitarist Aníbal Rigozzi was a founding member and left the group in 1996 to be replaced by Ariel Minimal, who left the group in 2008. Trombonist Fernando Albareda was in the band from 1991 to 2008. Percussionist Luciano Giugno was also a founding member, leaving in 1989. His replacement, Gerardo Rotblat joined in 1991; he died in 2008.

Collaborations and recognition 
The band, which collaborated with some music stars such as Mick Jones, Debbie Harry, Celia Cruz, Rubén Blades and Fishbone, received the MTV Latino Video Music Award in 1994 for the single "El Matador", in what probably was the peak of popularity of the band. The song made an appearance on the soundtracks for the movies Savages, Grosse Pointe Blank and The Matador. On September 29 of that year they produced an MTV Unplugged concert. The Cadillacs also won the 1998 Grammy Award for Best Latin Rock/Alternative Album, and were nominated in the 2000 Latin Grammy Awards for Best Band and Best Music Video ("La Vida"), which received the now-defunct International Viewer's Choice Award (Southern Region) at the 2000 MTV Video Music Awards.

Return 
On April 7, 2008, the band's front man, Vicentico, announced the band's return from a six-year break. According to Vicentico's mySpace, this represented a new phase for the band. On March 10, 2009, they released a new album, La Luz del Ritmo, distributed by Nacional Records in the US. Along with the release, the band toured throughout spring 2009 in the Americas.

Along with the news of their return, Vicentico's mySpace announced that due to Gerardo "Toto" Rotblat's recent death, the band had been forced to make changes. The new line-up was as follows: Vicentico (lead vocals), Flavio Cianciarullo (bass and backing vocals), Sergio Rotman (saxophone), Daniel Lozano (trumpet), Fernando Ricciardi (drums and percussion) and Mario Siperman (keyboards), all of whom are LFC veterans. In 2016, Vicentico and Flavio Cianciarulo's sons joined: Florián Fernández Capello (guitars) and Astor Cianciarulo (drums and bass).

Discography

Studio albums
Bares y Fondas (1986)
Yo Te Avisé (1987)
El Ritmo Mundial (1988)
El Satanico Dr. Cadillac (1989)
Volumen 5 (1990)
El León (1992)
Rey Azúcar (1995)
Fabulosos Calavera (1997)
La Marcha del Golazo Solitario (1999)
La Luz del Ritmo (2008)
El Arte De La Elegancia De LFC (2009)
La Salvación de Solo y Juan (2016)

Compilation albums
Sopa de Caracol (1991)
Vasos Vacíos (1993)
20 Grandes Exitos  (1998)
Obras Cumbres  (2000)

Live albums
En Vivo en Buenos Aires (1994)
Hola (2001)
Chau (2001)

References

Bibliography

External links

Argentine rock music groups
Rock en Español music groups
Grammy Award winners
Musical groups established in 1985
Musical groups disestablished in 2008
Musical groups from Buenos Aires
Latin Grammy Award winners
1985 establishments in Argentina